Carissa, also called Garsi, was a town of the Trocmi in ancient Galatia, Anatolia, located between Etonea and Amasya. It was inhabited during Roman and Byzantine times.

Its site is located near Elvan Çelebi, Asiatic Turkey.

References

Populated places in ancient Galatia
Populated places in ancient Pontus
Former populated places in Turkey
Roman towns and cities in Turkey
Populated places of the Byzantine Empire
History of Çorum Province
Ancient Greek archaeological sites in Turkey